Idlib University is a Syrian public university established in 2015, and studies began in it in the 2015-2016 semester. It initially included several colleges and institutes, then opened new branches, colleges and departments in the following years. A branch of Idlib University was opened in Al-Dana in 2020. Today, the number of university students has exceeded 18,000, and the university's teaching and administrative staff has exceeded 600 people.

In August 2021, the Engineering Affairs Directorate at the university announced the start of the process of restoring and developing the faculties of Idlib University with an area of 66 hectares. The main headquarters is in Idlib and its branch is in Al-Dana.

In 2022, Idlib University ranked 27343 globally, according to Webometrics Ranking of World Universities.

University History
A number of faculties affiliated with the University of Aleppo were established in Idlib governorate after the increase in the number of students studying in the governorate, to reduce the burden on the University of Aleppo and also to increase the number of students studying in the governorate, as a number of colleges and intermediate institutes were established in them, which remained administratively affiliated with the University of Aleppo.

Idlib governorate during the Syrian civil war in 2011 witnessed many events, and it was administratively outside the control of the Syrian government, but the faculties remained affiliated with the University of Aleppo until the announcement of the establishment of Idlib University in 2015 to become relatively independent from the University of Aleppo, and a large number of colleges and institutes were created to meet the needs of the governorate.

University Presidents

Facilities
The university includes nineteen colleges and seven institutes distributed in Idlib and the university branch in Al-Dana as follows:

colleges
 Faculty of Medicine.
 Faculty of Dentistry.
 Faculty of Pharmacy.
 Faculty of Informatics Engineering.
 Faculty of Civil Engineering.
 Faculty of Architecture.
 Faculty of Electrical and Electronic Engineering.
 Faculty of Mechanical Engineering.
 Faculty of Agricultural Engineering. 
 Faculty of Health Sciences.
 Faculty of Veterinary Medicine.
 Faculty of Science.
 Faculty of Economics and Management.
 Faculty of Sharia and Law.
 Faculty of Education.
 Faculty of Arts and Social Sciences. 
 The Second Faculty of Economics and Management, Al-Dana.
 The Second Faculty of Arts and Social Sciences, Al-Dana.
 The Second Faculty of Education, Al-Dana.

Institutes
 Turkish Language Institute.
 Computer Technical Institute.
 Technical Institute for Medical Equipment.
 Technical Institute for Financial and Administrative Sciences.
 Engineering Technical Institute.
 The Second Turkish Language Institute, Al-Dana.
 The Second Technical Institute for Financial and Administrative Sciences, Al-Dana.

University Hospitals
 Idlib University Hospital, It opened on Thursday, November 26, 2020 at 12:00PM
 Dental Clinics - Idlib University, Faculty of Dentistry

University Housing
In 2021, Idlib University established student housing for males and females in two separate areas in Idlib to ease the travel trouble and financial hardship for students. The university housing provides students with services including electricity, water, internet and security guards.

Scientific and cultural activities
Several conferences are held at the university that promotes awareness and culture in the nascent community and work to raise the level and quality of education through these conferences. The Student Office also organizes scientific and cultural forums to develop the cultural level of students.

University Research Journal
Idlib University Research Journal obtained the ISSN "International Standard Serial Number", after fulfilling the requirements of the French Regulatory Authority for the Standard Numbers of Research Journals.

See also
List of universities in Syria

References

Universities in Syria
2015 establishments in Syria